Dragan Vujković (born 4 April 1953) is a Yugoslav boxer. He competed in the men's middleweight event at the 1976 Summer Olympics.

References

External links
 

1953 births
Living people
Yugoslav male boxers
Olympic boxers of Yugoslavia
Boxers at the 1976 Summer Olympics
Place of birth missing (living people)
Mediterranean Games gold medalists for Yugoslavia
Competitors at the 1979 Mediterranean Games
Mediterranean Games medalists in boxing
AIBA World Boxing Championships medalists
Middleweight boxers